"That's Freedom" is a song written and performed by American singer-songwriter, Tom Kimmel. It was taken from his debut studio album, 5 to 1.

John Farnham version

In 1990, Australian pop rock singer John Farnham recorded a version of "That's Freedom". It was released in September 1990 as the second single from his 14th studio album Chain Reaction. The song peaked at number 6 on the ARIA Charts. 

At the ARIA Music Awards of 1991, the song was nominated for ARIA Award for Single of the Year.

Track listing
 Australian CD/7" single
 "That's Freedom" (7" version) – 4:16
 "New Day" – 4:14

 German 12" single
 "That's Freedom" (Club mix) – 7:36
 "In Your Hands" – 4:19
 "That's Freedom" (7" version) – 4:16

Charts

Weekly charts

Year-end charts

References

1987 songs
RCA Records singles
John Farnham songs
1987 singles
1990 singles